This is a list of Bangladeshi films that was released in 2008.

Releases

See also

List of Bangladeshi films of 2009
List of Bangladeshi films
Dhallywood
Cinema of Bangladesh

References

External links 
 Bangladeshi films on Internet Movie Database

Film
Bangladesh
 2008